Mohamed Abou Zeid is an Egyptian public sector technocrat and former minister of supply and internal trade in the Qandil cabinet who was in office from August 2012 to January 2013.

Career
Zeid was vice president of Egypt's Food Industries Holding Company, a state-owned enterprise. He was appointed minister of supply an internal trade on 2 August 2012, replacing Gouda Abdel Khaleq in the post. However, his term ended on 5 January 2013 when a cabinet reshuffle took place. Zeid was replaced by Bassem Ouda as minister.

References

Living people
Supply and internal trade ministers of Egypt
Year of birth missing (living people)
Independent politicians in Egypt